Line M11, officially referred to as the M11 Gayrettepe–Istanbul Airport–Halkalı Metro Line, is a line of the Istanbul Metro. , it is operational between Kağıthane and Istanbul Airport.

The purpose of this line is to provide direct and quick access from Istanbul Airport in Arnavutköy to Levent, Istanbul's main commercial center and to Halkalı, one of the city's most important train stations. Unlike other metro lines, the M11 will be a limited stop service, meaning that stations will be spaced further apart. This is most noticeable towards the line's southern ends, where the M11 will only have seven stations within Istanbul's urban area: Halkalı, Tema Park, Olimpiyat, Kayaşehir and Fenertepe in the west and Gayrettepe and Kâğıthane in the east.

It will have two legs, one from Gayrettepe to Istanbul Airport line and the second from
Halkalı to Istanbul Airport line. When fully completed, the M11 will be one of the longest continuous subway tunnels in the world. The line will run through six districts of Istanbul, Şişli, Kağıthane, Eyüpsultan, Arnavutköy, Başakşehir and Küçükçekmece. It is expected that the line will carry annually around 94 million passengers. The M11 line will connect to other rapid transit lines: Marmaray, M1, M2, M3, M7 (twice), M9   and at the airport to the high-speed train line.

The investment budget of the construction is  999.8 million. The Turkish construction consortium Kolin-Şenbay won the tender for the building of the metro line in December 2016. The line was not scheduled to be completed before the airport's official October 29, 2018 airport opening.

Stations 
The M11 has a total of sixteen stations. Out of these sixteen, only seven are within the Istanbul metropol area.

References

Istanbul Metro
Transport infrastructure under construction in Turkey
Şişli
Eyüp
Arnavutköy, Istanbul
Railway lines opened in 2023
Airport rail links in Turkey